Teodoro Sampaio is a municipality in the state of São Paulo in Brazil. The population is 23,273 (2020 est.) in an area of 1556 km². The elevation is 321 m.

The municipality contains part of the  Great Pontal Reserve, created in 1942.
It contains the  Morro do Diabo State Park, created in 1986.
It also contains 36% of the  Mico Leão Preto Ecological Station, established in 2002.

References

Municipalities in São Paulo (state)